Elizeus Burgess (1595–1652) was an English Anglican priest.

Burgess was educated at the St John's College, Oxford. He was Rector appointed of Cuxton in 1625; Archdeacon of Rochester in 1621; Canon of Ely in 1630; Vicar of St. Nicholas, Rochester in 1628; and Rector of Southfleet the same year.

Notes

17th-century English Anglican priests
Archdeacons of Rochester
Alumni of St John's College, Oxford
1652 deaths
1595 births